Iqbal Sheikh (born 15 January 1973) is a Pakistani former cricketer. He played in seventeen first-class and nineteen List A matches between 1995 and 2004. He is now an umpire, and stood in the match between Islamabad and Sui Southern Gas Company in the 2017–18 Quaid-e-Azam Trophy on 26 September 2017.

References

External links
 

1973 births
Living people
Pakistani cricketers
Pakistani cricket umpires
Place of birth missing (living people)
Hyderabad (Pakistan) cricketers